Cape Banks is a headland in the Australian state of South Australia located in the gazetted locality of Carpenter Rocks at the south end of Bucks Bay and the north end of Bungaloo Bay on the state's south east coast about  west south west of the city of Mount Gambier.

It was named by the Royal Navy officer, James Grant, on 3 December 1800.

The navigation aid known as the Cape Banks Lighthouse is not located on the cape but on an unnamed headland located at the northern end of Lighthouse Bay which is the next bay to the north-west of Bucks Bay.

Cape Banks, South Australia, should not be confused with the northern headland of Botany Bay, in New South Wales, which is also named Cape Banks.

References

B
B